Ṭaluq is a sub-district located in the Al-Misrakh District, Taiz Governorate, Yemen. Ṭaluq had a population of 3,229 according to the 2004 census.

Villages
Nariqah village.
Al-Najeed village.
Bani Mansur village.

References

Sub-districts in Al-Misrakh District